Saddil Ramdani (born 2 January 1999) is an Indonesian professional footballer who plays as a winger or attacking midfielder for Malaysia Super League club Sabah and the Indonesia national team.

Early career
Saddil Ramdani comes from the remote Muna Island in Southeast Sulawesi province in eastern Indonesia. He was born in Raha, the main port of Muna, but left his hometown after elementary school to find a way to develop his football hobby. First, he went to provincial capital Kendari where he trained at the Galasiswa soccer school. Impressing scouts from Indonesia's main island of Java, Saddil in 2012 ended up in the East Java city of Malang, where the Aji Santoso International Football Academy (ASIFA) is based. Under the guidance of former Indonesian national football team captain Aji Santoso who was also coaching the Indonesia national under-23 football team at that time, Saddil trained and lodged at ASIFA, which also enrolled him into a local secondary school that collaborates with the academy.

Saddil developed into a goal-scoring winger at ASIFA, attracting calls from the national youth teams. In the 2016 AFF U-19 Youth Championship, Saddil on 20 September 2016 scored a hattrick against Cambodia that triggered a race among professional Indonesian clubs to be the first to employ his talents.

Club career

Persela Lamongan
Before he graduated high school, Saddil signed for East Java club Persela Lamongan and played in the 2016 Indonesia Soccer Championship A. He scored his first goal for a professional club in October 2016 when Persela defeated Bali United 3-0. His 90th-minute goal sealed the upset victory. Persela frequently played the teenager in the 2017 Liga 1 and 2018 Liga 1 competitions. Schoolboy Saddil had to juggle between going to classes in Malang and playing for a professional club in Lamongan, three hours away, until he graduated in 2018.

Sri Pahang FC
His performance in various international youth competitions in Southeast Asia in 2016-18 made him one of the most exciting talents in the region. In January 2019, Saddil took a leap and signed with Malaysia Super League club Sri Pahang. He made a solid display of 21 appearances and two goals for his first season overseas.

Bhayangkara F.C.
After one year impressing in Malaysia, there was another race in Indonesia to recruit him. He eventually signed for Bhayangkara, a high-paying club owned by the Indonesian Police, to play in the 2020 Liga 1 season. However, he could only play three matches without scoring a goal due to the suspension of the league amid the COVID-19 pandemic.

Sabah F.C.
After his one-year contract with Bhayangkara ended, Saddil decided to play in Malaysia again. He accepted the offer from Sabah coach Kurniawan Dwi Yulianto, a legendary Indonesian striker, to play in the 2021 Malaysia Super League season.

2021 season
On 13 March, Saddil made his debut during a 0–1 league defeat against Petaling Jaya City. Three-days later, Saddil scored his first goal for Sabah against his former club Pahang but failed to make his new team avoid a 2–1 defeat. On 17 April, he scored and assisted a goal in a 4–0 win against UiTM.

2022 season
On 9 March, Saddil scored his first goal of the season, converting a freekick in a 3–1 league win against Petaling Jaya City. On 13 May, Saddil scored a winning goal in the 111th minute after extra-time against Kelantan United in the second-round of the 2022 Malaysia FA Cup , sending his club to the quarter-finals with a 2–1 win. On 17 May, Saddil assisted two-goals in a 4–2 league victory against Penang.

International career 
He made his international debut for the Indonesia senior team on 21 March 2017, against Myanmar.

On 17 August 2017, during a Southeast Asian Games match against Philippines U-23, Saddil scored in the 58th minute from long-range.

Saddil made his debut goal in the senior team against Nepal in a huge 7–0 win in the 2023 AFC Asian Cup qualification.

Career statistics

Club

International

International under-23 goals

International senior goals

Honours

International 
Indonesia U-19
 AFF U-19 Youth Championship third place: 2017, 2018
Indonesia U-23
 Southeast Asian Games  Bronze medal: 2017, 2021
 Southeast Asian Games  Silver medal: 2019

References

External links 
 
 

1999 births
Living people
Indonesian footballers
Persela Lamongan players
Sri Pahang FC players
Sabah F.C. (Malaysia) players
Liga 1 (Indonesia) players
Indonesia youth international footballers
Indonesia international footballers
Sportspeople from Southeast Sulawesi
Association football wingers
Southeast Asian Games bronze medalists for Indonesia
Southeast Asian Games medalists in football
Footballers at the 2018 Asian Games
Indonesian expatriate footballers
Competitors at the 2017 Southeast Asian Games
Expatriate footballers in Malaysia
Asian Games competitors for Indonesia
Competitors at the 2019 Southeast Asian Games
Southeast Asian Games silver medalists for Indonesia
Competitors at the 2021 Southeast Asian Games
20th-century Indonesian people
21st-century Indonesian people